Mermaid Boulevard is Kazumi Watanabe's sixth studio album, released in 1978.

Track listing

Personnel
 Kazumi Watanabe – guitar, guitar synth
 Ernie Watts – tenor saxophone, flute
 Patrice Rushen – electric piano, clavinet
 Jun Fukamachi – synthesizer, strings arrangement
 Lee Ritenour – guitar, arrangements
 Anthony Jackson – bass guitar
 Harvey Mason – drums
 Steve Forman – percussion
 Minako Yoshida – backing vocals

Production
 Executive producer – Kunihiko Murai
 Producer – Shunsuke Miyazumi
 Engineers – Phil Schier, Norio Yoshizawa
 Re–mixing Engineer – Phil Schier
 Assistant engineers – Joan Schier, Yasuhiko Terada, Atsushi Saito
 Art Direction – Aijiro Wakita
 Illustration – Koichi Sato
 Photography – Hiroshi Seo

Release history

References

1978 albums
Kazumi Watanabe albums
Alfa Records albums
Inner City Records albums